Hjördis Piuva Andersson (born June 10, 1933) is a Swedish-Tornedalian painter and writer.

He was born in Vojakkala, she currently lives in Övertorneå. She often does paintings of the environment of the Torne Valley. She has also released three books where she tells about her life in the Torne Valley.

Bibliography
Min barndom i Tornedalen – 1940-talet i målningar, oil paintings with text written in Swedish and Meänkieli, 1994, 
Bildkalender med tornedalsminnen, oil paintings with text written in Swedish and Meänkieli, 1998, 
Bilder från ungdomsåren, Watercolor paintings with text written in Swedish, 2002, 
Ett kattliv – en sann berättelse, 2009

References

1933 births
20th-century Swedish painters
21st-century Swedish painters
Swedish women artists
20th-century Swedish writers
Living people
20th-century Swedish women artists
21st-century Swedish women artists
20th-century Swedish women writers
Tornedalians